In organic chemistry, peroxyacyl nitrates (also known as Acyl peroxy nitrates, APN or PANs) are powerful respiratory and eye irritants present in photochemical smog.

For example, peroxyacetyl nitrate, :

Hydrocarbons + O2 + NO2 + light -> CH3COOONO2

The general equation is:

C_\mathit{x}H_\mathit{y}O3{} + NO2 -> C_\mathit{x}H_\mathit{y}O3NO2

They are good markers for the source of VOCs as either biogenic or anthropogenic, which is useful in the study of global and local effects of pollutants.

PANs are both toxic and irritating, as they dissolve more readily in water than ozone. They are lachrymators, causing eye irritation at concentrations of only a few parts per billion. At higher concentrations they cause extensive damage to vegetation.
Both PANs and their chlorinated derivates are said to be mutagenic, as they can be a factor causing skin cancer.

PANs are secondary pollutants, which means they are not directly emitted as exhaust from power plants or internal combustion engines, but they are formed from other pollutants by chemical reactions in the atmosphere. Free radical reactions catalyzed by ultraviolet light from the sun oxidize unburned hydrocarbons to aldehydes, ketones, and dicarbonyl compounds, whose secondary reactions create peroxyacyl radicals, which combine with nitrogen dioxide to form peroxyacyl nitrates.

The most common peroxyacyl radical is peroxyacetyl, which can be formed from the free radical oxidation of acetaldehyde, various ketones, or the photolysis of dicarbonyl compounds such as methylglyoxal or diacetyl.

This is important for tropospheric ozone production as PANs transport NOx to regions where it can more efficiently produce ozone.

References

Organic peroxides
Pollutants
Smog